Māori Americans are Americans of Māori descent, an ethnic group from New Zealand. 

Some Māori are Mormons and are drawn to Mormon regions of Hawaii and Utah, as well as in California, Arizona and Nevada. Māori were part of the first Mormon Polynesian colony of the US, which was founded in Utah in 1889. 

Since at least 1895, many Māori have immigrated to the US to study at universities and to seek employment opportunities, in addition to doing so for religious reasons.

Notable people

Sports
 David Dixon (American football), National Football League (NFL)
 TeTori Dixon, volleyball
 Rhett Ellison, National Football League (NFL)
 Riki Ellison, National Football League (NFL)
 Will Hinchcliff, National Football League (NFL)

Media
 Alex Aiono, singer
 Keala Settle, actress and singer
 Sasha Lane, actress
Daniel Logan, actor

See also 
 New Zealand Americans

References 

 
Americans
New Zealand American
Oceanian American
Pacific Islands American
Polynesian American